Anyanui is a village in Keta Municipal District, Ghana.

Anyanui is connected to Ada Foah by a ferry which runs every Wednesday, calling at a number of other villages on the way.

Anyanui is subject to coastal erosion and a $60 million project has been initiated to cover the 2.7 kilometres between Anyanui and Akplortorkor.

References

Populated places in the Volta Region
Villages in Ghana